Rodrigo Javier Noya García (born 31 January 1990) is an Argentine professional footballer. He is a naturalized Mexican citizen.

Honours
Veracruz
Copa MX: Clausura 2016

Oaxaca
Ascenso MX: Apertura 2017

External links

1990 births
Living people
Argentine footballers
Liga MX players
Ascenso MX players
C.F. Mérida footballers
C.D. Veracruz footballers
Alebrijes de Oaxaca players
Club Necaxa footballers
Atlético San Luis footballers
Expatriate footballers in Mexico
Association football defenders
Argentine expatriate footballers
Footballers from Buenos Aires